Todos los fuegos el fuego ("All Fires The Fire") is a book of eight short stories written by Julio Cortázar.

Stories
 "La autopista del sur" (South Highway)
 "La salud de los enfermos" (The Health of the Sick)
 "Reunión" (Meeting)
 "La Señorita Cora" (Miss Cora)
 "La isla a mediodía" (The Island At Noon)
 "Instrucciones para John Howell" (Instructions For John Howell)
 "Todos los fuegos el fuego" (All The Fires The Fire)
 "El otro cielo" (The Other Sky)

1966 short story collections
Short story collections by Julio Cortázar
Postmodern books